The 1998–99 Eredivisie season was the 39th season of the Eredivisie, the top level of ice hockey in the Netherlands. Six teams participated in the league, and the Nijmegen Tigers won the championship.

First round

Final round

Playoffs

External links 
 Season on hockeyarchives.info

Neth
Eredivisie (ice hockey) seasons
Ere 
Ere